= Oortsog Ovoo mine =

Tin mine in Mongolia

- Location: Mongolia
- Products: tin

The Oortsog Ovoo mine is a large open pit mine located in the central part of Mongolia. Oortsog Ovoo represents one of the largest tin reserves in Mongolia having estimated reserves of 196 million tonnes of ore grading 0.02% tin. The Oortsog Ovoo skarn-type tin deposit (Dundgovi Aimag, approx. 80 km SW of Choir): Prospecting work was carried out between 1986 and 1989 and 1990. The four cassiterite bearing skarn ore bodies are located in Upper Proterozoic, Upper JurassicLower Cretaceous rocks intruded by Late Paleozoic and Middle-Late Jurassic granites. The magnetite-rich skarn ore bodies are 75–150 m long, 1–32 m thick and 30–150 m deep. The grade varies between 0.5 and 2.18 % Sn, with minor amounts of Zn and Cu (<< 0.5%, + other sulphides), and Au (0.5 ppm).
